Arthur Cox (1891 – 12 June 1965) was an Irish solicitor, politician and priest.

The son of a medical doctor, Cox studied at Belvedere College and University College Dublin, where he graduated in 1913.  He practiced as a solicitor in Ireland from 1915 onwards, and in 1920 established the legal firm which still bears his name.  From university he came to know many who later took leading positions in the Irish Free State.

He was nominated by the Taoiseach to the 8th Seanad in 1954. He lost his seat at the 1957 Seanad election.

His wife, who was the widow of Kevin O'Higgins died in 1961, and he was ordained a priest in 1963. He went on a mission to Zambia where he died in a motor accident in 1965.

See also
Arthur Cox (law firm)

References

1891 births
1965 deaths
Irish solicitors
Members of the 8th Seanad
Nominated members of Seanad Éireann
Independent members of Seanad Éireann
People educated at Belvedere College